Pull Tight is an unincorporated community in Marion County, Alabama, United States.

It is unclear why the name "Pull Tight" was applied to this community. The name may be commendatory, as local residents "pull tight" (i.e. helped one another). Pull Tight has been frequently noted on lists of unusual place names.

References

Unincorporated communities in Marion County, Alabama
Unincorporated communities in Alabama